HB Colony  is a neighborhood situated on the northern part of Visakhapatnam City, India. The area, which falls under the local administrative limits of Greater Visakhapatnam Municipal Corporation, is one of the residential area in the city.

History
The name of this area came from the Housing Board which established the Residential Colony in this area by Government of Andhra Pradesh in the mid 80's.

About
HB Colony is surrounded by Seethammadhara and Venkojipalem. It is connected with Maddilapalem, Dwaraka Nagar, Jagadamba Centre and One Town (Visakhapatnam).

Transport
APSRTC routes

References

Neighbourhoods in Visakhapatnam